State Highway 360 (SH 360) is a  north–south state highway in the Dallas–Fort Worth metroplex in the U.S. state of Texas. It runs north from an at-grade intersection with US 287 in Mansfield, near the Ellis-Johnson county line to a partial interchange with SH 121 in Grapevine, near Dallas/Fort Worth International Airport. The highway serves as a local north–south route running through the center of the metroplex, linking together the southern and northern suburbs to the core. Between US 287 and Camp Wisdom Road/Sublett Road, SH 360 follows a pair of frontage roads along a four-lane tollway known as the 360 Tollway, a tollway operated by the NTTA. Between Camp Wisdom Road/Sublett Road and SH 121, SH 360 follows a toll-free freeway maintained by TxDOT.

The highway was opened in several stages throughout its existence. The first portion of the highway was designated on November 30, 1955, between US 80 (now SH 180) and SH 183. Newer portions of the highway were opened between 1960 and 2003. The 360 Tollway was opened in 2018, and is eventually planned to extend southward to a terminus at US 67 in Venus.

Route description
SH 360 begins as a pair of frontage roads at its southern terminus at an at-grade intersection with US 287 in Mansfield, near the Ellis-Johnson county line. In southwest Grand Prairie, SH 360 becomes a toll-free freeway at an intersection with Sublett Road/Camp Wisdom Road.

From there, the freeway proceeds north through Arlington near its boundary with Grand Prairie, where it interchanges with I-20 and then meets I-30.  However, SH 360 and I-30 are not directly connected.  As a legacy of the original toll road design of I-30 (formerly the Dallas-Fort Worth Turnpike), the highways connect only indirectly using long access roads that cross surface streets at lighted intersections.

From I-30, SH 360 then continues north beyond Arlington, interchanging with SH 183 near Euless.  From the SH 183 interchange, the freeway continues north-northwest through Euless and into Grapevine, following the western boundary of Dallas/Fort Worth International Airport.  SH 360 terminates at its northern terminus at a partial interchange with SH 121 in Grapevine.

History
SH 360 was constructed in different stages over the course of several decades. SH 360 was designated on November 30, 1955, from SH 183 south to US 80 (now SH 180). SH 360 was extended south in various stages, first to Spur 303 on July 25, 1960, I-20 on July 30, 1965, US 287 on June 10, 1966, and US 67 on August 26, 1969. SH 360 was extended north from SH 183 to SH 121 on May 6, 1969. For the most part, each section's frontage roads were built first, handling all of the traffic years before the actual freeway portion was completed (or even begun).  Similarly, the interchanges at I-20, I-30, and SH 183 were in place long before the freeway lanes were completed.

The indirect interchange between SH 360 and I-30 is a relic back from when I-30 existed as the Dallas/Fort Worth Turnpike. In order to direct traffic through toll booths, the interchange was designed so that any traffic moving from between the freeways were routed through one common, bi-directional ramp. This was done as a cost-saving measure, as it required fewer toll booths. The toll booths were removed in 1977, but the complex access road system remained.

South of SH 183, SH 360 was previously known as Watson Road.  The segment through Arlington is also officially designated as the "Angus G. Wynne Freeway" (after the founder of Six Flags); however, neither the official designation nor the older Watson Road name are locally used, and the road is generally called "360".

360 Tollway

The southernmost segment of SH 360 between US 287 in Mansfield and Camp Wisdom Road/Sublett Road in Grand Prairie was built between 1994 and 2003 as a pair of separated frontage roads, with space reserved between them for main freeway lanes to be added to meet future traffic needs.  As traffic along the corridor grew, the SH 360 frontage lanes became increasingly congested. Local and state leaders began studying the construction of SH 360 as a freeway between the existing frontage roads in a project that became known as "360 South". On January 25, 2013, TxDOT and the NTTA approved a deal to construct the extension as a four-lane toll road, the 360 Tollway, in a public–public partnership, with TxDOT performing the design and construction and the NTTA managing the completed freeway as part of its tollway system. Construction on the tollway began in November 2015. A ceremonial groundbreaking for construction of the 360 South toll road was held on October 21, 2015. The first phase of the project, which was planned to build two grade-separated toll lanes in each direction, was estimated to cost $330 million. The tollway opened to drivers on May 11, 2018, and became NTTA's newest toll road. In the future, the toll road may be expanded to four lanes in each direction. The  toll road has two names: the portion between US 287 and the Mansfield city limit is named the Senator Chris Harris Memorial Highway after the local legislator who aided the extension, and the portion from the Mansfield city limit to Camp Wisdom/Sublett Road is named the Rosa Parks Memorial Highway in memory of the late civil rights figure. The project cost a total of $340 million. Driving the entire length of the tollway costs $1.62 for TollTag users and $2.44 for nonusers, with drivers being billed via mail.

Future
The interchange between SH 360 and I-30 in Arlington has become a major bottleneck, compounded by the fact that it intersects with surface streets, and is near major tourist attractions including Six Flags Over Texas, Globe Life Field, Choctaw Stadium & AT&T Stadium.  In November 2014, the Texas Department of Transportation (TxDOT) announced that it would be conducting an environmental study on a potential $200 million rebuild of the interchange.  The rebuild would offer direct connections between SH 360 and I-30 for the first time.  In March 2015, TxDOT approved spending $254 million on the stack interchange project, which will also include improvements to nearby Six Flags Drive. Ground broke on March 2, 2016, and was estimated to be completed in fall 2020 at a cost of $233 million. Construction is still ongoing as of spring 2022.  

Additionally, the NTTA's future plans for SH 360 include another  extension of the toll road, which would run from the current SH 360 southern terminus in Mansfield to US 67 in Venus.

Major intersections

References

External links

360
Transportation in Ellis County, Texas
Transportation in Tarrant County, Texas